Cottus sabaudicus, the Rhone Sculpin, is a species of freshwater ray-finned fish belonging to the family Cottidae, the typical sculpins. It is endemic to France where it inhabits the Rhone River.

References

Cottus (fish)
Fish described in 2009
Freshwater fish of Europe